The Toledo, Lake Erie and Western Railway is a non-profit 501(c)(3), and heritage railroad operating on  of railway, ex- Norfolk and Western Railroad, née-Toledo, St. Louis and Western Railroad (later acquired by the Nickel Plate Road) and crosses the Maumee River on a  bridge, which was constructed in 1916. This bridge is the largest owned by a tourist railroad east of the Mississippi River. The TLEW owns from MP 15 in Waterville to MP 25 in Grand Rapids, Ohio, acquired when NW was filing abandonment on the line south of MP 15. In addition to the purchase of the 10 miles of mainline track, the TLEW had leased from MP 13.2 to MP 15 through Waterville from the Norfolk Western, which later became Norfolk Southern in 1982.

The Toledo, Lake Erie and Western operates the Bluebird passenger train, however operations were temporarily shut down due to track improvements needing to be completed in 2009, but due to vandalism, the railroad failed to reopen for the 2010 season. In 2013, the Museum's ALCO S4, #5109, was painted back into its original Chesapeake and Ohio colors in September 2013; another theft occurred soon after the 5109's repaint, the rare Nathan M5 horn that was planned to be used on 5109, was stolen off site and has yet to be found. An additional setback following the vandalism, was a failed attempt at creating a for-profit freight/non-profit passenger partnership in 2011. Following the premature termination of the for-profit's lease on December 31, 2014, Museum members returned on the rails, working on the passenger equipment, locomotives, and track in order to restore it all back into running order.

On February 14, 2014, the TLEW acquired the Waterfront Electric Railway Museum at 17475 Saylor Lane in Grand Rapids, Ohio. A car barn, shop and a 256 square foot brick building that will be used as a gift shop and to present photographs and historic displays. Also included in this acquisition, was a former CTA Elevated Car and a PTC Snow Sweeper. Due to the for-profit's control of the mainline, TLEW volunteers focused almost all of their effort in rehabilitating the new acquisition in order to make it a feasible work space and revenue generator. By May 10, 2014, the Museum had their first open house on property, which proved to be a success. In addition to the Museum, the TLEW has a static "Museum Train" located closer to Downtown Grand Rapids with Locomotives #1 and #202, a tool car, a caboose and passenger coach. Due to the acquisition of the property, this train is now mostly reserved for special events and meetings.

Ever since shutting down in 2009, the Bluebird Passenger Train has not made any revenue runs. However, volunteers have been working hard and made attempts for a return of their passenger train. Donations to help fund the restoration are currently being accepted at TLEW.ORG. In addition to the fund raising, motorcar runs over the Maumee River are being operated out of Grand Rapids every weekend during summer months to showcase the scenic Maumee River and surrounding area.

Equipment

Locomotives

Former units

Coaches 
 No. 403 - Used on Museum Train
 No. 404 - Planned for Bluebird Passenger Train
 No. 407 - Under Restoration
 No. 408 - Planned for Bluebird Passenger Train

References

Heritage railroads in Ohio
Transportation in Lucas County, Ohio
Transportation in Wood County, Ohio
Museums in Wood County, Ohio
Museums in Lucas County, Ohio
Railroad museums in Ohio